Sosnovy is a rural locality (a settlement) in Verkhnetoyemskoye Rural Settlement of Verkhnetoyemsky District, Arkhangelsk Oblast, Russia. The population was 245 as of 2010. There are 5 streets.

Geography 
Sosnovy is located 21 km northwest of Verkhnyaya Toyma (the district's administrative centre) by road. Larionovskaya is the nearest rural locality.

References 

Rural localities in Verkhnetoyemsky District